Mycosphaerella cerasella is a fungal plant pathogen.

See also
List of Mycosphaerella species

References

cCerasella
Fungal plant pathogens and diseases
Fungi described in 1878